Satyendra Chandra Mitra (23 December 1888 – 27 October 1942) was an Indian freedom fighter, who started his political career as a revolutionary and got associated with the Jugantar Party. He was arrested and interned at Janjira Char in the middle of the River Padma (now in Bangladesh) in 1916 and was released after the Great War. He continued his studies and after becoming an Advocate in the High Court of Calcutta, he joined the Swaraj Party founded by Deshabandhu Chittaranjan Das. The then British Administration were afraid of the success of the Swaraj Party and feared a revolution. It was then that he was imprisoned in Mandalay Jail in Burma along with fellow leaders of the Swaraj Party, Netaji Subhas Chandra Bose and Anil Baran Roy from 1924 to 1927. On being released, he was elected unopposed to the Central Legislative Assembly, the precursor to the Indian Parliament, in 1927. He was a Member of The Age of Consent Committee in 1927-28 that was composed of parliamentarians to determine the age at which girls and boys could marry. It became The Child Marriage Restraint Act in 1929 and is popularly referred to as the Sarda Act. He fought tirelessly for the welfare and release of political prisoners in the Central Assembly. He was elected the Chief Whip of the Swaraj Party when Pandit Motilal Nehru was its leader. The Swaraj Party was then merged with the Congress Party. In 1934 he returned to Calcutta on being defeated in the General Election that year. Later he became the President of the Bengal Legislative Council (of un-divided Bengal) in 1937 till his demise on 27 October 1942. He left behind his wife Uma Mitra and only child, Aroti Dutt.

References 
1. https://indianhistorycollective.com/satyendra-chandra-mitra/

2. https://dailyasianage.com/news/210634/satyendra-chandra-mitra

1888 births
1942 deaths
Bengali Hindus
20th-century Bengalis
People from Noakhali District
Members of the Central Legislative Assembly of India
University of Calcutta alumni
Indian independence activists from Bengal
City College, Kolkata alumni
Indian independence activists from West Bengal
Bengali lawyers
West Bengal politicians